The Sphingosinicellaceae are a family of the Sphingomonadales.

References 

Sphingomonadales
Bacteria families
Alphaproteobacteria